Daniel Shaughnessy (born 8 September 1944) is a Canadian long-distance runner. He competed in the men's 10,000 metres at the 1976 Summer Olympics.

References

1944 births
Living people
Athletes (track and field) at the 1976 Summer Olympics
Canadian male long-distance runners
Olympic track and field athletes of Canada
Athletes (track and field) at the 1974 British Commonwealth Games
Commonwealth Games competitors for Canada
Place of birth missing (living people)